The McCreary railway station is a flag stop in McCreary, Manitoba, Canada.  The station is served by Via Rail's Winnipeg–Churchill train.

The station building was built in 1912 by the Canadian Northern Railway as a class 3 station, to standard plan RSR-029, with station functions on the ground floor and living quarters for the station agent above.
The station building was designated a national historic railway station in 1991. The station is now unmanned, as the building is not used by passengers.

See also

 List of designated heritage railway stations of Canada

Footnotes

External links 
Via Rail Station Information
Government of Manitoba Map (4C)

Via Rail stations in Manitoba
Railway stations in Manitoba
Designated Heritage Railway Stations in Manitoba
Canadian Register of Historic Places in Manitoba
Railway stations in Canada opened in 1912
1912 establishments in Manitoba